Sussex County may refer to:

Australia
 Sussex County, Western Australia

United States
 Sussex County, Delaware
 Sussex County, New Jersey
 Sussex County, Virginia

England
 Sussex, also known as "the County of Sussex"
 Royal Sussex County Hospital in Brighton (sometimes informally referred to as the Sussex County)